Naan Sigappu Manithan is a 2014 Tamil-language action thriller film directed by Thiru and produced by UTV Motion Pictures. Co-produced by Vishal, the film stars himself in the leading role with Lakshmi Menon and Ineya in supporting roles, while G. V. Prakash Kumar composed the film's music. The film deals with narcolepsy. It was released on 11 April 2014, and was declared a commercial success. The film opened to positive reviews from critics, many praising Vishal's performances, screenplay, fast-paced narration, while some criticized its second half, which was apparently vulgar to them.

Plot
In the middle of the night, Indhiran, accompanied by his friends Sathish and Karuna, purchase a gun illegally from a local gangster. Back home, Indhiran stares at his wish list and recalls his past.

Past: Since childhood, Indhiran has been suffering from narcolepsy, a rare disorder, which makes him fall asleep whenever his emotions reach an extreme level and hinders him from living an ordinary life. He needs to be accompanied all the time. Companies hesitate to hire him, although he has excelled in academics, and he cannot impregnate women since he falls asleep during sex. However, he can still hear whatever is being said while he sleeps. Indhiran creates a bucket list with goals that he wants to achieve on his own. One day, he ventures out alone, which was one of his goals. When he is almost hit by a vehicle while crossing the road, his fear mounts, and he falls asleep in the middle of the road. 

A passerby makes him pose as an orphaned corpse and gathers money from onlookers for his burial. Meera, who passes by, takes pity and shells out almost five grands. Later, Meera meets Indhiran in a shopping mall and falls unconscious upon seeing him alive. After clearing the misunderstanding, they start dating and fall for each other. Meera makes one of Indhiran's dreams come true (i.e. getting a kiss from a beautiful woman by kissing him), but her father opposes their marriage as Indhiran cannot give birth to a child. Meera urges Indhiran to find a way how he could stay awake. It dawns on Indhiran that he had never fallen asleep while taking a shower. Believing that her father will accept Indhiran only when his potency is proved, Meera and Indhiran have sex underwater in their pool, resulting in Meera becoming pregnant. 

On a late-night drive, Meera and Indhiran find themselves in an under-construction bridge. Their car is hit by another, and the shock makes Indhiran doze and Meera is attacked and assaulted by unknown thugs. Indiran can hear the entire incident but remains asleep, and sheds a tear for being helpless. Meera falls into a coma, and her child is aborted. A heartbroken Indhiran vows to exact revenge on the perpetrators.

Present: Deciding to venge all by himself, Indhiran fails to testify to the police. He begins to question people who knew Meera. Inquiring Meera's friends, Indhiran first suspects Karthik, a rich but ill-mannered guy whose marriage proposal was rejected by Meera. Indhiran confronts him, but he denies any knowledge about the incident, even offering to help Indhiran if required. Indhiran realises that the sound of the sudden obstacles make him sleep. To prevent this, he buys a portable audio player and uses it with full volume. A transform explosion right next him has no effect on him because of the music and thus he realises his newfound advantage. 

Indhiran also resorts to meditation teacher who teaches him about staying calm and being immune to shock by expecting the event before hand. Indhiran stays awake a full night and tries to control his sleep by standing between two loud trains with the audio player playing at full volume. After obtaining control, Indhiran gets information from a sympathetic police officer regarding attack cases to find a lead. He remembers that one of the thugs's name Sekhar and his ringtone, while the police finds out that the offenders rode a red car. Indhiran stumbles upon a red car in a petrol bunk and inquires the driver, who claims that the car was with a mechanic named Sekhar on the day the crime took place. 

At the workshop, Indhiran spots the mechanic who tries to abscond, recognizing Indhiran, and a chase ensues, leading them to a building under construction. Informed by Sathish, Karuna arrives there and kills Sekhar. He then slits himself to convince Indhiran that he was assaulted by Sekhar who the escaped the scene. He is then admitted for treatment. Karuna then recollects.

Past: Married to Karuna for two years, Kavitha was dissatisfied with her drunkard husband; she begins an affair with Aravind, a rich friend of Karuna. He spends a lot of money on buying her expensive gifts. Indhiran gains knowledge of this and advises Kavitha against it. It turns out that Karuna, to realize his ambitions of running a business in the US, had been using his wife to manipulate Aravind. Citing Indhiran's confrontation, Kavitha bluffed to Aravind that if Karuna learns of the affair, he would kill them both. She suggested that the only way to solve it once and for all is to arrange the amount of  20 million that Karuna needs to settle in the states. With him gone, they could enjoy being together. Aravind agreed to finance Karuna out of his lust for her.

Later, when Karuna and Kavitha are celebrating their success, Indhiran drops by unexpectedly. They mess up; Indhiran suspects them and informs Aravind, who confronts the couple. When Aravind realizes that he had been cheated, he hits Kavitha in a fit of rage, and she dies after the hit lands her head on the corner of a cupboard. Infuriated, Karuna retaliates and kills Aravind. Karuna arranges for disposing of them with the help of the thugs and lies to Indhiran that Kavitha has eloped with Aravind. Since he assumed that Indhiran was responsible for Kavitha's death, Karuna had planned to take vengeance by making him suffer the same way and requested the thugs to attack Meera.

Present: The remaining thugs insist Karuna to bring Indhiran to the same place where Sekhar was killed. Finding out that it was Karuna who had killed Sekhar, they beat him up. When Indhiran arrives, The thugs removes the audio player from Indhiran, who gets an adrenaline rush and dozes off. While the thugs are thrashing him, one of them breaks a water pump, which splashes water all over and awakens Indhiran, who kills them all, except Karuna. Indhiran tells that he had seen Karuna killing Sekhar. When Indhiran questions Karuna as to why he sent thugs to attack Meera, Karuna angrily tells him that it was revenge for Kavitha's death, which was caused by Indhiran telling Aravind the truth. 

Karuna angrily attacks Indhiran and Indhiran retaliates back, hitting Karuna violently. Despite feeling bad for his friend and hesitant to kill him due to their close friendship, he remembers Meera and kicks Karuna into a steel bar, killing him. With all his wishes fulfilled, Indhiran has a new wish that he would make Meera recover soon. The final scene shows Indhiran hugging Meera, who is tearful hearing him, which shows that she is definitely recovering.

Cast

 Vishal as Indhiran
 Lakshmi Menon as Meera
 Saranya Ponvannan as Sumathi
 Ineya as Kavitha (dubbed by Suchitra)
Jayaprakash as Meera's father
 Sunder Ramu as Karuna
 Jagan as Sathish
 Chethan Cheenu as Aravind
 Prinz Nithik as Guna
 Rishi as Karthik
 Mayilsamy as Passerby
 Aarthi as Periyanayaki
 V. I. S. Jayapalan
 Pyramid Natarajan
 Nisha Krishnan
 Shyamili Sukumar

Production and distribution
Vishal announced that director Thiru would direct a film under his production house in June 2013, and that Jai would play the lead role in the film. However, in October 2013, Jai announced that his schedules were busy and thus Vishal himself opted to play the lead role in the film. Lakshmi Menon was selected to play the lead heroine.

The film began production on 29 November 2013, and it was announced that Ineya was added to the cast to play another leading female role.

STAR Vijay bought the satellite rights.

Soundtrack

The soundtrack album was composed by G. V. Prakash Kumar.

Critical reception
The film opened to positive reviews from critics, many praising Vishal's performances, screenplay, fast-paced narration, while some criticized its second half, which was apparently vulgar to them.

Baradwaj Rangan of The Hindu wrote, "The hero is a narcoleptic, and this aspect is not just a cool marketing gimmick. It has been integrated into the very fibre of the film...The first half is strong..the director, Thiru, displays a lot of control in scenes that could have erupted into melodrama....And then we enter the second half, and the film goes haywire...Still, given the general state of hero-oriented Tamil cinema, where a hollow kind of masculinity is endlessly celebrated, it’s nice to root for a hero who isn’t a slacker but a brilliant student, and who sits down with his pals for a cup of tea, rather than booze, and who gets rejected by a girl his mother sets him up with". Sify stated, "Thiru is able to make an engrossing actor driven entertainer without any super hero gimmicks. Naan Sigappu Manithan  is an gripping entertainer which is not run-of-the-mill". Siddarth Srinivas of Cinemalead gave 3.5/5 and concluded, "Vishal sleeps, you wont!" The Times of India gave it 3/5 and wrote, "There is intelligence in this script...but Thiru slips quite a bit in the second half as he goes for one twist too many in explaining why Meera is attacked. What we are left with is a feeling of mild discontent, as a promising premise is compromised for a generic revenge drama". Rediff gave 3/5 and stated, "Naan Sigappu Manithan is a riveting revenge drama with an honest narrative, excellent performances and many entertaining twists and turns". OneIndia rated the film 3/5 and called it an "edge-of-the-seat entertainer" and a "perfect commercial film for all classes". Anupama Subramanian of the Deccan Chronicle gave 3/5 and wrote, "Overall, a gripping entertainer with an unusual theme.". Indiaglitz gave 2.75/5 and concluded, "A fair entertainer that loses the steam through the second half.". Behindwoods gave it 2.75/5 stars and stated, "Despite minor moments where the script deviates from its USP, Naan Sigappu Manithan pulls through as a pretty tense drama that ticks the commercial requirements". IANS gave 2.5/5 and wrote, "NSM stands testimonial to the fact that a simple story that has been milked dry over the years can still be narrated in myriad engaging ways. One such way is what we see in this film, which is not an exceptional thriller, but definitely has the potential to keep you hooked." Hindustan Times gave 2/5 and stated, "Despite a novel subject, Naan Sigappu Manithan fails to deliver". Bharath Vijaykumar of Moviecrow gave 2.75/5 and concluded, "NSM has a neat first half and a decent second half with disconnect between the two halves.".

Box office

The film opened magnificent response at the box office by collecting 12.14 crore in its first day. The film grossed 30.1 crore in its first weekend despite having competition from Tenaliraman (film).The film grossed 3.52 crore in Chennai first week. According to traders, the film grossed 95 crore worldwide in its final collection. The film declared 'Super-Hit' at the box office. The film became a hat-trick hit for Vishal as well as Thiru.

References

External links
 

2014 films
2014 action thriller films
Indian action thriller films
Indian films about revenge
Films about sleep disorders
Films about disability in India
Films scored by G. V. Prakash Kumar
Films directed by Thiru (director)
2010s Tamil-language films
UTV Motion Pictures films
Narcolepsy in fiction
Tamil films remade in other languages